The Fry-Barry House is a one-story, brick and frame house located at 314 W. Austin in Marshall, Texas.  Built in 1860 the house is one of the oldest homes in Marshall.  It was designed by W.R.D. Ward, a planter and merchant who also designed Magnolia Hall.  Major Edwin James Fry, a businessman and banker,  purchased the house in 1872.  When Fry died in 1927, his daughter, Pamela and her husband, Walter L. Barry inherited the house.  Mary Louise Barry inherited the house in 1961.

The house is currently owned by Joslin Marshall.

The house was made a Recorded Texas Historic Landmark and a historic marker was installed in 1962. It was also listed as a National Register of Historic Places in 1979.

See also

National Register of Historic Places listings in Harrison County, Texas
Recorded Texas Historic Landmarks in Harrison County

References

External links

Fry-Barry House from the Center for Regional Heritage Research, Stephen F. Austin State University

National Register of Historic Places in Harrison County, Texas
Greek Revival architecture in Texas
Houses completed in 1853
Harrison County, Texas
Recorded Texas Historic Landmarks